The Upper Hay Lake Archeological District (Smithsonian trinomials 21CW7 and 21CW14) is a prehistoric Native American archaeological site in Jenkins Township, Minnesota, United States.  It consists of about 75 linear mounds—including one of the state's longest at —plus the sites of a village and a portage.  The mound grouping has also been dubbed Fort Poualak.  The site was listed on the National Register of Historic Places in 1978 for having local significance in the theme of archaeology.  It was nominated for indicating an area of substantial activity during the Blackduck phase of the Late Woodland period.

Description
The Upper Hay Lake Archeological District has two main groupings of features. Although they were given separate Smithsonian trinomials, the two groupings are considered one site.

The eastern two rows are the shortest, running only . An early survey also noted the circular depression of a lodge nearby.

Archaeological history
Jacob V. Brower first documented the site in 1897, excavating one mound and removing some bone material.  He returned to conduct a more thorough survey from May 20 to 29, 1901.  Brower carefully estimated that the mounds had required  of soil to construct.  It was he who dubbed the linear mound grouping "Fort Poualak".

In the 1930s, local resident Frithiof T. Gustavson developed a strong interest in archaeology and conducted amateur excavations at the site.  He recovered several artifacts from the occupation phase, including an intact ceramic pot that became known as the "Fort Poualak Pot".  Gustavson exhibited these relics widely, delivering lectures at schools and county fairs, and ultimately became superintendent of a museum in Cass Lake.  Gustavson's descendants donated the pot to the Minnesota Historical Society in 1997.  It was classified as St. Croix Stamped ware and carbon from its outer surface was radiocarbon dated to 550 C.E.  An analysis of residues on the interior of the pot found traces of wild rice.

Following reports that the site may have been damaged by private timber harvesting, the state arranged a Lidar survey in 2010.  Only about 50 of the mounds were found to be still extant.

See also
 National Register of Historic Places listings in Crow Wing County, Minnesota

References

Archaeological sites on the National Register of Historic Places in Minnesota
Geography of Crow Wing County, Minnesota
Historic districts on the National Register of Historic Places in Minnesota
Mounds in Minnesota
National Register of Historic Places in Crow Wing County, Minnesota
Native American history of Minnesota
Woodland period